Alessandro Guido Latif (born 11 April 1996 in London, England) is a British/Italian race car driver. Latif is the youngest race winner of a V de V Proto Endurance Challenge race. In 2014 he competed in  the Blancpain Sprint Series driving for Phoenix Racing, the Daytona 24 Hours and Sebring 12 Hours driving an Audi R8 LMS for Flying Lizard Motorsports. Latif's early career involved an upbringing in karts and Formula Renault 2.0.

Early life
Latif was born on 11 April 1996 in London, England.  His father is Pakistani born and mother is Italian, both whom currently reside in London, England. Latif started in karting at aged 11.

Racing career

Karts

Latif's karting career began in 2007 where he rose up the ranks to race in the international scene. As well as developing his race craft he achieved notable success in British and European events, as well as in World Karting.

Single Seater's
In 2012 Latif moved to Formula Renault 2.0 Eurocup and Formula Renault 2.0 Alps driving for Atech Grand Prix completing 8 races.

Sports car racing
Latif signed with Avelon Formula to drive a CN2 (per the Group CN classification) Sports prototype in the V de V Proto Endurance Challenge for the remainder of the 2012 season, where he won his inaugural race in the 4 Heures du Castellet.

In 2013, Latif remained with Avelon Formula in the V de V Proto Endurance Challenge, while also competing in the opening rounds of the SPEED Euroseries. Latif won the 6 Hours of Mugello with teammate Ivan Bellarosa in front of the team's home crowd. They later went on to win the opening rounds of the Speed Euroseries at the Hungaroring.

In 2014 Latif signed with Flying Lizard Motorsports to race at the Daytona 24 Hours in the number 35 Audi R8 LMS, where they finished 5th in the GTD class.

Latif competed in the 2014 12 Hours Sebring in Florida on 12–15 March, where they finished 8th in the GTD class.

Latif also joins with Phoenix Racing for Blancpain Sprint Series alongside Marc Basseng.

Latif was set to race a Nissan Zytec in the 24 Hours of Le Mans race on 14–15 June with the Greaves Motorsport Team. However, after starting 26th on the 54-car grid, the team achieved a top 10 position before their efforts were thwarted after a blameless collision by a co-driver on lap 31 ended the race for them.

Racing record

US Endurance results

Blancpain Sprint Series results
Note: classified as Pro for the Nogaro race

24 Hours of Le Mans results

Pro Mazda Championship

References

External links
 

Living people
1996 births
British people of Italian descent
British racing drivers
Italian racing drivers
Italian people of Pakistani descent
24 Hours of Daytona drivers
24 Hours of Le Mans drivers
Sportspeople from London
People educated at Marlborough College
WeatherTech SportsCar Championship drivers
Indy Pro 2000 Championship drivers
British sportspeople of Pakistani descent
Porsche Carrera Cup GB drivers
Greaves Motorsport drivers
Phoenix Racing drivers